María Cristina is a Mexican drama film directed by Ramón Pereda. It was released in 1951 and starring María Antonieta Pons and Carlos Cores. The film was inspired in the song María Cristina me quiere gobernar by Ñico Saquito.

Plot
Maria Cristina (María Antonieta Pons) is an unemployed provincial young girl reaching to the Mexico City accompanied by her grandmother (Prudencia Grifell) settling into a neighborhood. A neighbor recommends working in a cabaret behind her grandmother. There, Maria Cristina finds the love.

Cast
 María Antonieta Pons ... María Cristina
 Carlos Cores 
 Fernando Casanova
 Prudencia Grifell ... María Cristina's grandmother
 Carolina Barret

Reviews
The film premiered in four rooms of Mexico City in 1951. The journalist Mauricio Peña related in his analysis of this film for the magazine Somos in 1999: We assure you that is not easy to recover after seeing María Antonieta Pons in "Maria Cristina", because even the conventional story, is the absolute pinnacle of the art of this beautiful Cuban rumbera.

References

External links
 

1951 films
Mexican black-and-white films
Rumberas films
1950s Spanish-language films
Mexican drama films
1951 drama films
1950s Mexican films